Hemilampra is a genus of hoverflies

Species
H. australis (Macquart, 1850)
H. dichoptica (Thompson, 2003)

References

Hoverfly genera
Taxa named by Pierre-Justin-Marie Macquart